American High is an American documentary television show about the lives of fourteen students at Highland Park High School, located in the city of Highland Park, Illinois. The series originally aired on Fox and was canceled after four episodes. It was later picked up by PBS and aired in its entirety. The series was created by R. J. Cutler, a documentary filmmaker. The show received the 2001 Emmy Award for Outstanding Non-Fiction Program.

The theme song "American High (Now It's Everything)", was written and performed by Bouncing Souls.

An earlier Fox Network documentary series from 1991, Yearbook also covered the lives of suburban Chicago high school students.

Plot
Kaytee's gift for song steers an inner turmoil about her future. Morgan's sullen and needy exterior masks his true compassion. After revealing his deepest secret to his peers, what's next for Brad? Who are they? These are real teenagers who unleash their adolescent anxieties amid their triumphs in American High. At the brink of adulthood, they face some of the toughest decisions and harshest realizations of their lives during the 1999-2000 school year at a suburban Chicago high school. But these kids aren’t actors. The situations aren’t contrived. The programs are not scripted. Cameras roll and the ensuing drama is riveting and real.

American High is an innovative drama series from Academy Award-nominated filmmaker R.J. Cutler ("The War Room," "The Perfect Candidate"). Following the lives of a group of students as they deal with their personal conflicts – both at home and at school – from the first day of senior year through graduation, the series is culled from 10 months of documentary footage shot by Cutler and his production team, which includes some of America's leading documentary filmmakers. Also featured in the series are scenes from hundreds of hours of "video diaries" shot by the students themselves. This remarkable combination of professional footage and student-shot video provides a window into what it's like to be a teenager growing up in America today.

Brimming with exuberance, hipness and stylish editing, American High boasts authenticity as well as addictive drama. "They trusted our crews to tell their stories truthfully and honestly," says producer Cutler of the students. "I wanted this to be as honest as any of the best cinéma vérité documentaries." And Cutler has succeeded, with scenes that are often brutally frank. The footage from the students’ own video diaries is among the most fascinating.

These scenes capture an eclectic mix of characters baring their souls as they confront conflicts with powerful emotions. Precocious Kaytee, the gifted singer/songwriter whose music fills the hallways at school and creates decision-making dilemmas for her. Easygoing and athletic Robby, whose best friend is Brad – the first high-profile kid to announce his homosexuality, confronts the future of his shaky relationship with Sarah. Anna, whose intimidating beauty affords her everything except what she really wants – a boyfriend. Mike ("Kiwi"), the star football kicker whose future hinges on a successful season. One of the series’ most dynamic characters, rebellious Morgan, comes across as angry and needy, masking a compassionate and sensitive nature. Half a dozen other students reveal complex natures and share their innermost feelings.

Episodes

References

External links
 
 Actual Reality Pictures website for American High

2000 American television series debuts
2001 American television series endings
2000s American teen drama television series
2000s American high school television series
2000s American reality television series
English-language television shows
Fox Broadcasting Company original programming
Television series about teenagers
Television series by 20th Century Fox Television
PBS original programming
Primetime Emmy Award for Outstanding Reality Program winners
Highland Park, Illinois